George Neville Griffiths (23 January 1840 – 28 April 1905) was a New South Wales colonial politician.

He was born in Sydney to banker George Richard Griffiths and Letitita Chatfield. Educated in England, he graduated from Cambridge University with a Bachelor of Arts in 1861, soon returning to Australia. After a period in Queensland, he returned to Sydney and purchased property throughout both colonies, also founding a stock agents' firm. On 3 March 1874 he married Ada Frances Scott, the daughter of John Scott M.L.A. and M.L.C., with whom he had eight children.

He was elected to the New South Wales Legislative Assembly for East Sydney in 1882, but he was defeated in 1885.

Griffiths died in Darlinghurst in 1905. He and his wife Ada Frances are buried in Waverley Cemetery.

Griffiths and Ada Scott had four sons and four daughters:
 Frederick Guy, b. 18 July 1876 and d. 6 June 1952
 John Neville, b. 9 September 1881 and killed in action in France 30 November 1917
 Hugh, b. 18 November 1885 and killed in action at Gallipoli 6 August 1915
Francis, b. 10 March 1890
 Agnes Laetitia, b. 21 March 1875
 Ada Violet, b. 9 February 1878
 Noel Eve, b. 24 December 1879
Florence Denise, b. 15 August 1883, married 29 October 1906 William Charles Wentworth III, and were the parents of William Charles Wentworth IV M.P.

See also

References

External links
Ada's Story (Ada, wife of G. N. Griffiths), by Jill Brown, librarian technician, Fisher Library: Sydney University Record: The University Archives 2010 pp. 23-25
 

1840 births
1905 deaths
Members of the New South Wales Legislative Assembly
19th-century Australian politicians
Australian expatriates in the United Kingdom